Cixila (died 783) was the Archbishop of Toledo from 774 until his death in 783.  He was archbishop during the Muslim control of most of Spain.

Sources
This article is based on the Spanish Wikipedia article on Cixila.

8th-century archbishops
Archbishops of Toledo
783 deaths
Year of birth unknown
Place of birth unknown